Mortada Ahmed Mohamed Mansour (born 17 June 1952 in Cairo) is an Egyptian lawyer who serves as president of Zamalek SC since 2014. Mansour announced his intention on 6 April 2014 to pursue the presidency in the 2014 Egyptian presidential election, though he withdrew on 19 April and announced his support for former defense minister Abdel Fattah el-Sisi for the presidency.

Education and Politics
Mansour studied law at Ain Shams University, and graduated in 1974. He later worked at Ismailia Procuracy, before he became a president court.

After two failed attempts in 1990 and 1995, he became a member of the Egyptian Parliament, from 2000 to 2005, then from 2015 to 2020, representing Dakahlia Governorate.

Career at Zamalek
Mansour joined Zamalek in 1992, then he served as a board member from 1996 until 2001, when he became vice-president to Kamal Darwish, before winning the club's presidential election against the latter in April 2005. In December 2005, Egyptian Minister of Youth, Mamdouh El-Beltagy, declared the dissolution of Zamalek's board of directors, in which Morsi Atallah was appointed as president until the next elections; however, Mansour returned to his position in April 2006.

In August 2006, Minister of Sport, Hassan Sakr, announced the second dissolution of the board, as Mansour was sentenced on charges of insulting the head of a judicial body, El-Sayed Naofel, and trying to storm his office. Mansour was imprisoned in 2007 for three years, which was later reduced to one year. In 2009, he lost the elections against Mamdouh Abbas, before defeating Kamal Darwish in 2014.

Personal life
Mansour is married to Najwa al-Deeb, with whom he has two sons and one daughter.

Opinions

Mansour has called the day of the Egyptian Revolution of 2011, 25 January, "the worst-ever day in Egypt's history".
He also holds very strict and negative thoughts and comments towards Zamalek SC's arch rival, Al-Ahly, and consistently accuses them of manipulating the Egyptian football federation for fixing the schedules in their favor. He also believed that black magic and genies were responsible for Zamalek SC's bad luck and poor performances.

Mansour is a vocal critic of actresses and their dresses in Egyptian media. During the COVID-19 pandemic, he criticized robots like Sophia and her manufacturers for imitating God's creation, when he said:

Legal issues and controversies
In September 2018, Mansour was suspended by CAF for one year with a fee of 40,000 USD, as he offended its President Ahmad Ahmad and General Secretary Amr Fahmy.

In January 2020, the Egyptian parliament led by Ali Abdel Aal refused three demands to strip Mansour of immunity, due to the presence of malicious suspicion of the complaints, and previous disagreements between him and the accusers.

In August 2020, there was a hearing in the Egyptian parliament whether to lift immunity of Mansour, following a voice leak, in which he insulted Al-Ahly president Mahmoud El Khatib and his former player Mahmoud Kahraba. In the meantime, Mansour claimed that his phone was hacked by a Qatari intelligence officer.

On 4 October 2020, the board of directors of the Egyptian Olympic Committee decided to suspend Mortada Mansour from practicing any sporting activity in Egypt for four years, based on complaints submitted by the president of Al-Ahly Mahmoud El Khatib and many others.

On 22 November 2021, Mansour and his board of directors officially returned back to Zamalek SC management, following the departure of the normalization committee until the club's elections. On 12 February 2022, Mansour became the president of Zamalek club for the third time, after the elections held by the club through the general assembly.

On 24 January 2023, Mark Clattenburg who served as president of the Egyptian Referees Committee resigned from his position and left Egypt, due to threats from fans after Mansour alleged that he was in a gay relationship.

On 25 February 2023, Mansour turned himself in to Egyptian authorities to serve a one-month prison sentence at Wadi el-Natrun, over a defamation case against Al-Ahly president Mahmoud El Khatib.

References

1952 births
Lawyers from Cairo
Zamalek SC presidents
Living people
Politicians from Cairo
Ain Shams University alumni